The 1932 New Hampshire Wildcats football team was an American football team that represented the University of New Hampshire as a member of the New England Conference during the 1932 college football season. In its 17th season under head coach William "Butch" Cowell, the team played its home games in Durham, New Hampshire, at Memorial Field. The team compiled a 3–4–1 record, and were outscored by their opponents, 110–105. All four losses came in away games, while the team recorded three wins and a tie in Durham.

Schedule

Boston University was coached by Myles Lane, who had played ice hockey with the Stanley Cup-winning 1928–29 Boston Bruins, and was inducted to the College Football Hall of Fame in 1970.

Wildcat captain Arthur Learmonth, who had been born in Orkney, Scotland, would go on to earn a master's degree in education; he served in the United States Navy, and worked for the United States Department of Labor for 35 years—he died in February 2004 at age 93.

Notes

References

New Hampshire
New Hampshire Wildcats football seasons
New Hampshire Wildcats football